The blue jay is a species of bird that is native to South America.

Blue Jay or Blue Jays may also refer to:

Animals
 Graphium evemon, a species of butterfly found in South-east Asia
 A general term for American jays, most of which have largely blue plumage

People and characters
 The nickname of child prodigy composer Jay Greenberg
 Mascot for Raytown Senior High School
 Mascot for Guthrie High School
 The Blue Jay, a name for the character Mortimer Folchart in the novel Inkheart
 Blue Jay (comics), a diminutive DC Comics superhero

Places
 Blue Jay, California, U.S.
 Blue Jay, Ohio, U.S.
 Blue Jay, Pennsylvania, U.S.; a place in Pennsylvania
 Blue Jay, West Virginia, U.S.
 Blue Jays Way, Toronto, Ontario, Canada; the street in Toronto that Rogers Centre, the stadium that is home to the Toronto Blue Jays and the Toronto Argonauts, is addressed to

Sports
 Toronto Blue Jays, a Major League Baseball team based in Toronto, Ontario, Canada, and 4 of its minor league affiliates:
 Dunedin Blue Jays, of the Advanced-A Florida State League, based in Dunedin, Florida
 Gulf Coast Blue Jays, of the Rookie-level Gulf Coast League, also based in Dunedin
 Bluefield Blue Jays, of the Rookie-level Appalachian League, based in Bluefield, Virginia
 Dominican Summer League Blue Jays, of the Rookie-level Dominican Summer League, based in Boca Chica, Dominican Republic
 A short-lived name for the Philadelphia Phillies in the 1940s
 Johns Hopkins Blue Jays, the mascot and teams of Johns Hopkins University
 Creighton Bluejays, nickname for students, faculty, and alumni of Creighton University and its sports teams
 Minnesota West Bluejays, nickname for student, faculty and alumni of Minnesota West Community and Technical College and its sports teams

Media, entertainment, arts
 The Blue Jays, a short-lived (1961–62) Los Angeles based doo wop quartet
 Bluejay Books, an independent publishing house run by James Frenkel
 Blue Jay (film), a 2016 film starring Mark Duplass and Sarah Paulson
 Blue Jays (album), a 1975 album by Justin Hayward and John Lodge

Other uses
 Blue Jay missile, a code name used during development of the de Havilland Firestreak missile
 Blue Jay (dinghy), a class of sailboat used primarily in the north-eastern United States
 BlueJ, a Java development environment
 Operation Blue Jay, the code name for the construction of Thule Air Base in Greenland

See also

 "Blue Jay Way", a 1967 song by The Beatles
 
 Blue (disambiguation)
 J (disambiguation)
 Jay (disambiguation)
 jay bird (disambiguation)